Wolfgard Voss (Mönning, 24 June 1926 – 7 July 2020), nicknamed "Wölfi", was a German gymnast. She competed in seven events at the 1952 Summer Olympics.

References

External links
 

1926 births
2020 deaths
German female artistic gymnasts
Olympic gymnasts of Germany
Gymnasts at the 1952 Summer Olympics
Sportspeople from Oldenburg